Masi is a comune (municipality) in the Province of Padua in the Italian region Veneto, located about  southwest of Venice and about  southwest of Padua.  

Masi borders the following municipalities: Badia Polesine, Castelbaldo, Merlara, Piacenza d'Adige.

People 
 Fausto Zonaro (1854 - 1929), the last Court Painter to the Ottoman Empire.

References

Cities and towns in Veneto